Bryan Richard Posthumus (born  1984) is an American politician serving as a member of the Michigan House of Representatives from the 90th district. Elected in 2020, he assumed office on January 1, 2021.

Early life and education
Bryan Posthumus was born in 1984 in Grand Rapids, Michigan to parents Pam and Dick Posthumus. Dick would later serve as Lieutenant Governor of Michigan. Bryan's sister Lisa Posthumus Lyons served as a state representative. Posthumus graduated from Lowell High School in 2003 and earned a bachelor's degree in agribusiness management from Michigan State University in 2007.

Career
Posthumus is a fourth-generation farmer, and the co-owner of West Michigan Hopyards. Posthumas has served on the Farm Bureau. Apart from the agriculture business, Posthumus has also served as the CEO and director of consulting for Tuebor Strategies, vice president of business development for USA Financial, and Compactio, Inc. On November 3, 2020, Posthumus was elected to the Michigan House of Representatives, where he has represented the 73rd district since January 1, 2021.

After redistricting, Posthumus was left in the 90th district, where he is seeking re-election. Posthumus, on August 2, defeated former police officer Kathy Clark in the Republican primary. In the general election, Posthumus defeated Democratic nominee Meagan Hintz.

Personal life
Posthumus resides in Cannon Township, Michigan. Posthumus is Christian.

Arrest and Conviction 
On April 30, 2021, Posthumus was arrested on suspicion of drunk driving. During the incident, in Ada Township, he started to drive off-road, hit a mailbox, and then his car rolled over. At the time of the crash, his blood alcohol level was .13%, while Michigan's legal limit is .08%. On July 23, Posthumus pleaded guilty to the misdemeanor charge and was sentenced to 15 days in jail along with two years probation, 15 days of community service, and a $1,820 fine. He pledged to pay back the state for any legislative salary earned during time served and reported that he is living a healthy and sober life after giving up drinking the day of his April 30 accident and arrest. Posthumus was previously convicted for drunk driving in 2013.

References

Living people
1980s births
Businesspeople from Grand Rapids, Michigan
Christians from Michigan
Farmers from Michigan
Republican Party members of the Michigan House of Representatives
Michigan politicians convicted of crimes
Michigan State University alumni
Politicians from Grand Rapids, Michigan
21st-century American businesspeople
21st-century American politicians